SK Kölsch was German television series produced in Cologne, which was broadcast on Sat.1 from 1999 to 2006.

See also
List of German television series

External links
 

German crime television series
1990s German police procedural television series
2000s German police procedural television series
1999 German television series debuts
2006 German television series endings
Television shows set in Cologne
German-language television shows
Sat.1 original programming